Marko Lihteneker (September 21, 1959 – May 5, 2005) was a Slovenian ski mountaineer and mountain climber.

Lihteneker, at this time member of the GRS Celje took part in the 2004 World Championship of Ski Mountaineering in Aran Valley, where he placed sixth in the relay race event together with Tone Karničar, Žiga Karničar and Jernej Karničar. He was last seen alive a few metres from the summit, when he tried to solve problems with his oxygen system. His body was found by Chinese porters. The Memorial Staneta Veninška in Marka Lihtenekerja race is named to honour him.

See also

List of people who died climbing Mount Everest

References

1959 births
2005 deaths
Slovenian male ski mountaineers
Slovenian mountain climbers
Mountaineering deaths on Mount Everest